The Linzer Orgeltabulatur is an emblematic organ tablature of the early baroque era. Compiled in Linz, Austria, between 1611 and 1613, it is presently held by the Oberösterreichische Landesmuseum in this same city (catalogue no. 9647, MusHS. 3).

Its music
Its remarkable feature is its musical content, which, as opposed to most of the organ books of its time, is not meant to be performed in the church, but rather in a secular, domestic setting. Indeed, the names of the pieces refer to folk or court dances pertaining to the national traditions of Germany (Tantz, Danz Beurlin), of France (Brandle, Curanta Francesca), of Italy (Paduana, Pergamasco), and of England (Englischer Aufzug). It appears that most of these dances were intended for the regal, a small reed-organ fashionable in homes during the Renaissance and early Baroque, rather than for church organs.

Title list
The Linzer organ tablature contains 108 titles, 43 of which were transcribed and published in 1998 (see References). The titles appearing in the printed edition are the following :

Padoana
Madrigale Songuesti crespicrimè guesti il
Tantz
Dantz Hausmanni
Cupido
Tantz
Pergamasco
Englossa
Danntz "Zur muetter sprach das Töchterlein"
Brandle
Tantz
Curanta Francesca
Intrada
Paduana
Tantz
Intrada Landgraf Boriz
Danz Beurlin
Intrada
Neuer Danz
Neuer Picklhäring
Französisch Tannz
Paduoan
Auf mein Gsang
Intrada
Gar fest ist mir mein herz enzündt
Tannz "Jesu Du zartes Lämblein"
Paduana
Tantz
Paduana
Galliarda
Ach wehe dem herzen mein
Fortuna weil unmöglich ist
Balletta Marcury
Neuer Tanz "Pickelhäring"
Englischer Aufzug
Ein festes Tänzlein
Mein trauern ach Gott ist ohne Endt
Curanta
Tantz
Ach Lieb in Laidt
Intrada
Mein Hertz ist in der Lieb entzündth
Mit Seufzen und mit Klagen
Dantz
Es flog ein keines Waldvögelein
Sol dann die Treue mein
Pergamasco

References
Schierning, Lydia. Die Überlieferung der deutschen Orgel-und Klaviermusik aus der ersten Hälfte des 17. Jahrhunderts. Kassel: Bärenreiter, 1961, p. 110–11.
Linzer Orgeltabulatur. Selections (Diletto musicale, Nr. 1273.), edited by Sabine und Siegfried Petri. Vienna: Doblinger, 1998.

Compositions for organ
Baroque compositions
Austrian music
Linz